Balázs Holló (born 10 February 1999) is a Hungarian swimmer. He competed in the men's 4 × 200 metre freestyle relay at the 2020 Summer Olympics.

References

External links
 

1999 births
Living people
Hungarian male swimmers
Hungarian male freestyle swimmers
Olympic swimmers of Hungary
Swimmers at the 2020 Summer Olympics
Sportspeople from Eger
European Aquatics Championships medalists in swimming
20th-century Hungarian people
21st-century Hungarian people